Michel Scheuer (20 May 1927 – 31 March 2015) was a West German sprint canoeist, born in Rodange, Luxembourg, who competed in the 1950s. Competing in two Summer Olympics, he won three medals with a gold (1956: K-2 1000 m) and two bronzes (1952, 1956: K-1 10000 m).

Scheuer also won three medals at the ICF Canoe Sprint World Championships; two gold (K-4 1000 m and K-4 10000 m: both 1958) and a silver (K-2 1000m:1954). Scheuer died at the age of 87 in 2015.

References

External links
 
 

1927 births
2015 deaths
People from Pétange
Canoeists at the 1952 Summer Olympics
Canoeists at the 1956 Summer Olympics
German male canoeists
Olympic canoeists of Germany
Olympic canoeists of the United Team of Germany
Olympic gold medalists for the United Team of Germany
Olympic bronze medalists for the United Team of Germany
Olympic bronze medalists for Germany
Olympic medalists in canoeing
ICF Canoe Sprint World Championships medalists in kayak
Medalists at the 1956 Summer Olympics
Medalists at the 1952 Summer Olympics